Muhammad Marhan Mohd Jalil (born 5 March 1990) is a Malaysian field hockey player who plays as a midfielder.

Biography
Marhan was born in Muar, Johor.

References

External links
FIH profile

1990 births
Living people
People from Johor
People from Muar
Malaysian people of Malay descent
Malaysian Muslims
Malaysian male field hockey players
Field hockey players at the 2010 Asian Games
Field hockey players at the 2014 Asian Games
2014 Men's Hockey World Cup players
2018 Men's Hockey World Cup players
Asian Games medalists in field hockey
Field hockey players at the 2018 Asian Games
Asian Games silver medalists for Malaysia
Medalists at the 2010 Asian Games
Medalists at the 2018 Asian Games
Southeast Asian Games gold medalists for Malaysia
Southeast Asian Games medalists in field hockey
Competitors at the 2017 Southeast Asian Games
2023 Men's FIH Hockey World Cup players
21st-century Malaysian people